Reese Johnson (born July 10, 1998) is a Canadian professional ice hockey forward currently playing with the  Chicago Blackhawks of the National Hockey League (NHL).

Playing career
Johnson played as a youth with the Saskatoon Blazers in the SMAAAHL, before he was signed by major junior club, the Red Deer Rebels of the Western Hockey League (WHL). 

Johnson played in five seasons with the Rebels, captaining the club during his final season in 2018–19 and compiling a career high 27 goals and 53 points through 67 regular season games. As an undrafted free agent, Johnson was signed by the Chicago Blackhawks to a three-year, entry-level contract on March 6, 2019. Following a first-round exit with the Rebels to complete his junior career, Johnson embarked on his professional career by joining the Blackhawks AHL affiliate, the Rockford IceHogs, for the final stages of the 2018–19 season, posting 4 assists through 6 games.

In the pandemic delayed 2020–21 season, after attending the Blackhawks training camp, Johnson was originally assigned to Rockford's training camp. On January 21, 2021, he was added to Chicago's Taxi squad, and through a growing list of players ruled out through the COVID protocol, Johnson was called up to make his NHL debut with the Blackhawks against the Columbus Blue Jackets on January 31, 2021. He recorded his first career NHL goal on November 23 in a 5–2 loss to the Calgary Flames.

Career statistics

References

External links

1998 births
Living people
Chicago Blackhawks players
Red Deer Rebels players
Rockford IceHogs (AHL) players
Undrafted National Hockey League players